Ramal de Moura is a closed railway branch in Portugal, which connected the stations of Beja, on the Linha do Alentejo, and Moura. The sections from Beja to Quintos, Serpa, Pias, and Moura were opened on 2 November 1869, 14 April 1878, 14 February 1887, and 27 December 1902, respectively. The line was closed in 1990.

See also 
 List of railway lines in Portugal
 List of Portuguese locomotives and railcars
 History of rail transport in Portugal

References

Iberian gauge railways
Railway lines in Portugal
Railway lines opened in 1869
Railway lines closed in 1990